Pantaleon was a Macedonian hetairos from Pydna, who was appointed by Alexander the Great as phrourarch of Memphis in 331 BC.

References
Arrian iii 5. §4
Who's Who in the Age of Alexander the Great by Waldemar Heckel 

Phrourarchs of Alexander the Great
Hetairoi
4th-century BC Macedonians
Ancient Pydnaeans